Black Wind may refer to:
 Black Wind (Cussler novel), a 2004 Dirk Pitt novel by Clive Cussler and Dirk Cussler
 Black Wind (F. Paul Wilson novel), a novel by F. Paul Wilson
 Black Wind (film), a 1965 Mexican film
 Black Wind, the translation of Machin Shin, an entity in the Wheel of Time series
 "Black Wind", an episode of NCIS: Los Angeles (season 6)